Standings and results for Group 3 of the UEFA Euro 1980 qualifying tournament.

Group 3 consisted of Cyprus, Romania, Spain and Yugoslavia. Group winners were Spain, who pipped Yugoslavia by a single point.

Final table

Results

Goalscorers

References

Group 2
qual
qual
1978–79 in Romanian football
1979–80 in Romanian football
1978–79 in Yugoslav football
1979–80 in Yugoslav football
football
football